Pakistan Association of the Deaf (PAD) is the national organisation representing deaf people in Pakistan. It is a member of the World Federation of the Deaf.

References

External links
 Official website

1987 establishments in Pakistan
Deaf culture in Pakistan
Deafness rights organizations
Disability organisations based in Pakistan
Organizations established in 1987
Organisations based in Karachi